Kim Jin-su (born 13 June 1992) is a South Korean footballer who plays for Jeonbuk Hyundai Motors, on loan from Al-Nassr and the South Korea national team, as a left-back.

Club career

On 13 January 2012, Albirex Niigata announced the signings of both Kim Jin-su and his compatriot Kim Young-keun. On 19 February 2012, Kim made his professional debut against Vissel Kobe in a pre-season friendly match, which Albirex won 3-0. Furthermore, he scored his first professional goal in the same match, with a long range strike.

He made his competitive debut in a J1 League match against Kawasaki Frontale on 10 March 2012, playing the full 90 minutes.

On his birthday in 2014, TSG 1899 Hoffenheim announced the signing of Kim Jin-su. Later on, he returned to Korea to play for Jeonbuk Hyundai Motors in 2017.

In 2020, he signed for Saudi club Al-Nassr.

International career
Kim has represented South Korea at many youth levels. He had participated in the 2009 FIFA U-17 World Cup and the 2011 FIFA U-20 World Cup.

2013 EAFF East Asian Cup 
On 20 July 2013, Kim made his debut for the South Korea senior team against Australia in a 0–0 draw. And South Korea ended in third place.

2014 Asian Games 
Kim was selected for the football tournament at the 2014 Asian Games which was hosted by Korea Republic. His team won the final match in a 1-0 against North Korea, which guaranteed the entire squad's exemption from mandatory military service.

2018 World Cup 
In May 2018 he was named in South Korea’s preliminary 28 man squad for the 2018 World Cup in Russia. Kim Jin-su, who was uncertain about the 2018 World Cup finals due to injuries, was pushed out of the final competition for the  2018 World Cup in Russia.

2017 & 2019 EAFF E-1 Football Championship 
Kim Jin-su was selected to play in both 2017 and 2019 EAFF E-1 Football Championship. He played in both final matches which led them win the first place.

2019 AFC Asian Cup 
In round 16 match, he scored a goal in 2-1 victory against Bahrain in overtime and the team advanced to quarter-final which later eliminated by Qatar, the eventual champion of 2019 AFC Asian Cup.

2022 World Cup 
In 2022 FIFA World Cup, Kim Jin-su played full-time in all group stage matches and played in a last match against Brazil. He did an excellent job in the match against Uruguay. Despite being a goalless draw, there were plenty of good performances from his team and Kim Jin-su stood out. The 30-year-old veteran defender was impressive both offensively and defensively during the game. Overall, he made three tackles, one clearance, won five ground duels, four aerial duels and completed three crosses in the match. 
He also assisted the first goal to Cho Gue-sung in a second match against Ghana on 28 November. Despite exit from the world cup, his team successfully advanced to the round of 16 which was achieved after 12 years.

Career statistics

Club

International
Scores and results list South Korea's goal tally first.

Honours

Club
Jeonbuk Hyundai Motors
K League 1 (5): 2017, 2018, 2019, 2020, 2021
Korean FA Cup (2): 2020, 2022

International
South Korea U23
 Asian Games: 2014

South Korea
 EAFF E-1 Football Championship (2): 2017, 2019

Individual
K League 1 Best XI (2): 2017, 2022

References

External links

 Kim Jin-su – National Team Stats at KFA 
 
 
 Kim Jin-su at Asian Games Incheon 2014

1992 births
Living people
Association football fullbacks
South Korean footballers
South Korea under-17 international footballers
South Korea under-20 international footballers
South Korea under-23 international footballers
South Korea international footballers
South Korean expatriate footballers
Albirex Niigata players
J1 League players
TSG 1899 Hoffenheim players
Bundesliga players
K League 1 players
Al Nassr FC players
Saudi Professional League players
Jeonbuk Hyundai Motors players
Expatriate footballers in Japan
Expatriate footballers in Germany
Expatriate footballers in Saudi Arabia
South Korean expatriate sportspeople in Japan
South Korean expatriate sportspeople in Germany
South Korean expatriate sportspeople in Saudi Arabia
Kyung Hee University alumni
Footballers at the 2014 Asian Games
Asian Games medalists in football
2015 AFC Asian Cup players
Asian Games gold medalists for South Korea
Medalists at the 2014 Asian Games
2019 AFC Asian Cup players
People from Jeonju
Sportspeople from North Jeolla Province
2022 FIFA World Cup players